Martyn Lewis is a British former journalist and TV presenter.

Martyn Lewis may also refer to:

Martyn Lewis (badminton)

See also
Martin Lewis (disambiguation)